Silver Blue is a jazz album by saxophonist Dexter Gordon and saxophonist Al Cohn, recorded in 1976 for Xanadu Records.

Reception

Allmusic awarded the album 3 stars with its review by Scott Yanow stating "Recorded at the same session as True Blue, this Xanadu LP gets the edge due to a remarkable version of "On the Trail" that is a fascinating unaccompanied duet... Highly recommended for bop fans".

Track listing
"Allen's Alley" (Denzil Best) - 13:37
"Silver Blue" (Al Cohn, Dexter Gordon) - 19:34
"On the Trail" (Ferde Grofé) - 8:25

Personnel 
 Al Cohn & Dexter Gordon - tenor saxophone
 Blue Mitchell, Sam Noto - trumpet
 Barry Harris - piano
 Sam Jones - bass
 Louis Hayes - drums

References

1976 albums
Xanadu Records albums
Dexter Gordon albums
Al Cohn albums
Albums produced by Don Schlitten